CSIR-Structural Engineering Research Centre (CSIR-SERC), Chennai is one of the 38 constituent laboratories of the Council of Scientific and Industrial Research in India. The institute is a certified ISO:9001 quality institute.

Charter
CSIR-SERC is involved in research and development in the field of designing, construction and rehabilitation of structures. The institute provides services including design consultancy and proof checking to various public and private sector organizations.

Specialized courses for practicing engineers are also provided by the institute.

Facilities
The institute has various laboratories, which are listed as follows.

 Advance Concrete Testing and Evaluation Lab
 Advance Materials Lab 
 Advanced Seismic Testing and Research Lab
 Fatigue and Fracture Lab
 Special and Multifunctional Structures Lab
 Steel Structures Lab
 Structural Health Monitoring Lab
 Theoretical & Computational Mechanics Lab
 Tower Testing & Research Station
 Wind Engineering Lab

See also
 Official website of www.serc.res.in

References

Council of Scientific and Industrial Research
Research institutes in Chennai
Structural engineering
Research institutes in Tamil Nadu
1965 establishments in Madras State
Research institutes established in 1965